The 2013 Gooik–Geraardsbergen–Gooik was a one-day women's cycle race held in Belgium on May 26 2013. The tour has an UCI rating of 1.2. The race was won by  the Emma Johansson of Orica–AIS.

References

2013 in Belgian sport
2013 in women's road cycling
Gooik-Geraardsbergen-Gooik